Wildman River Wilderness Work Camp was  an Australian minimum security prison for juvenile males  located in the Northern Territory of Australia  in the  Mary River National Park about   from the territory capital of Darwin.

Facilities
Established during the 1980s, the work camp was designed for juvenile detainees from remote Aboriginal communities. The focus of the camp was on reparation through work for the Parks and Wildlife Commission of the Northern Territory, other government agencies and service clubs. The camp has capacity for 20 male detainees and offers case management in support of offender rehabilitation. As at 2005, the facility was not in operation.

References

External links
Wildman River Wilderness Work Camp (1986 - c. 2004)

Prisons in the Northern Territory
Juvenile detention centres in Australia
Defunct prisons in Australia